Chaman-e Bid or Chaman Bid may refer to:
 Chaman-e Bid, Afghanistan
 Chaman Bid, Chaharmahal and Bakhtiari, Iran
 Chaman Bid, Fars, Iran
 Chaman-e Bid, North Khorasan, Iran